Hıdırlar can refer to:

 Hıdırlar, Bartın
 Hıdırlar, Hamamözü
 Hıdırlar, Kızılcahamam
 Hıdırlar, Nallıhan
 Hıdırlar, Yenice